Ana Dias may refer to:

Ana Dias (born 1974), Portuguese marathon runner
Ana Dias Lourenço (born 1957), Angolan politician
Ana Dias (photographer) (born 1984), Portuguese photographer

See also
 Dias (surname)